The 41st Massachusetts General Court, consisting of the Massachusetts Senate and the Massachusetts House of Representatives, met in 1820 and 1821 during the governorship of John Brooks. John Phillips served as president of the Senate and Elijah H. Mills served as speaker of the House.

Senators

Representatives

See also
 Massachusetts Constitutional Convention of 1820–1821
 16th United States Congress
 17th United States Congress
 List of Massachusetts General Courts

References

External links
 . (Includes data for state senate and house elections in 1820)
 
 

Political history of Massachusetts
Massachusetts legislative sessions
massachusetts
1820 in Massachusetts
massachusetts
1821 in Massachusetts